Bauke is a masculine Dutch given name. Notable people with the name include:

Bauke Muller (born 1962), Dutch bridge player
Bauke Mollema (born 1986), Dutch cyclist
Bauke Roolvink (1912–1979), Dutch politician and trade union leader

See also
Baucke

Dutch masculine given names